Valeur is a surname. Notable people with the surname include:

Charlotte Valeur, Danish merchant banker
Henrik Valeur (born 1966), Danish architect
Martha Seim Valeur (born 1923), Norwegian politician
Peter Valeur (1847–1922), Norwegian politician

See also
HMS Valeur